Ostha is a genus of moths of the family Erebidae. The genus was erected by Francis Walker in 1861.

Species
Ostha aega (Felder & Rogenhofer, 1874) Brazil (Amazonas)
Ostha cambogialis Hampson, 1926 Brazil (Amazonas)
Ostha concinna Schaus, 1913 Costa Rica
Ostha cybele Schaus, 1914 Guyana
Ostha diplosticta Hampson, 1926 Brazil (Espírito Santo)
Ostha hypsea Schaus, 1913 Costa Rica
Ostha hyriaria Hampson, 1926 Peru
Ostha memoria Dyar, 1918 Mexico
Ostha nomion Schaus, 1913 Costa Rica
Ostha oenopion Schaus, 1914 French Guiana
Ostha ofella Schaus, 1914 French Guiana
Ostha rama Schaus, 1913 Costa Rica
Ostha recinna Dognin, 1914 British Guiana
Ostha sileniata Walker, 1862 Brazil (Ega)

References

Calpinae